French people living outside France (French: Français établis hors de France) are French citizens living outside the current territory of the French Republic. 

At the end of 2019, the French presence abroad was estimated at more than 2.5 million people. They had the right to vote in the 2021 French consular elections.

Since 2012, French people living outside France have been represented in the National Assembly by eleven members of parliament elected in the eleven constituencies for French residents overseas.

References 
French diaspora

See also 

 British Overseas citizen
 Swiss abroad